Hengdian World Studios is a film studio located in Hengdian, a Chinese town in the city of Dongyang, Zhejiang Province. It is one of the largest film studios in the world. The movie studio is operated by the privately owned Hengdian Group
founded by Xu Wenrong. Xu turned acres of farmland in central Zhejiang into one of the largest movie studios in Asia. Construction began in the mid-1990s and has been ongoing ever since with the possible recent addition of the replica of the Old Summer Palace. A film about extras working at the studio, I Am Somebody, was released in China in 2015.

Studio 
The studio’s sets are free for film crews; the studio makes returns on the hotels, restaurants, equipment and costumes.
The studio consists of 30 outdoor shooting bases and 130 indoor studio sets, with a total area of up to 330 ha. and building areas of 495,995 square meters. In addition to its huge scale, the studio also has several records which includes:

 Largest Indoor Buddha Figure in China.
 Largest Scale Indoor Studio.
 Highest number of Films and Teleplay Shoots as of 2005.

One of the studio's largest buildings is the Imperial Palace Building built in the Early Chinese Dynasty style in the Qin and Han periods. That area is still frequently used to shoot movies based on these eras. The director Zhang Yimou used this building as the backdrop for the Emperor Qin's palace for his 2002 movie Hero. A Hong Kong TVB drama serial titled A Step into the Past which tells the story of the First Qin Emperor also used the same building as the main backdrop. The studio was also used to film The Forbidden Kingdom, the first on-screen collaboration between actors Jackie Chan and Jet Li. In addition, it was also used for the filming of the popular Korean drama serial Empress Ki.
More than 1,200 movies and TV shows have been shot there, including Ang Lee's Oscar-winning Crouching Tiger, Hidden Dragon; the Mummy: Tomb of the Dragon Emperor, which is Hollywood co-produced using sets in the Studio; live-action Mulan (2020 film) released on Disney+ on September 4, 2020 in the US.

History 
In 1996, Guangzhou Street Scenic Area, the first film and television shooting base, was built to shoot the gifted blockbuster Opium War by director Xie Jin.
In 1997, the King of Qin Palace scienic spot was constructed for the production of the historical blockbuster Jing Ke stabbing the King of Qin.
In 2000, its all scenes are declared free of rent.
In 2004, Hengdian Film and Television Industry Experimental Zone was established as China's number one national film and television industry experimental zone.
In 2010, Hengdian World Studios was listed as a national AAAAA level Scenic Spot.

Visitor attendance 
In additional to being a film studio, Hengdian World Studios has also become a tourist attraction, with many of its large sets opening to visitors.

Film and television 
It has been reported that around 70 percent of period Chinese television shows and films are being shot at Hengdian World Studios every year.

Film

Confucius
Detective Dee and the Mystery of the Phantom Flame
DOA: Dead or Alive
I Am Somebody
Iron Road
The Man with the Iron Fists
The Opium War
Reign of Assassins
Snow Flower and the Secret Fan
The Warriors Gate

TV series 

Beauty's Rival in Palace
Carol of Zhenguan
The Confidant
Founding Emperor of Ming Dynasty
The Heaven Sword and Dragon Saber
Legend of Nine Tails Fox
Madam White Snake
Palace
The Patriotic Knights
A Step into the Past
Story of Yanxi Palace
Zheng He Xia Xiyang

Select attractions

Notes

External links 

 Hengdian World Studios official website 
 Hengdian World Studios official website 
 Hengdian Group - Parent Company

Chinese film studios
Buildings and structures in Jinhua
Dongyang